Mesoclemmys nasuta is a species of turtle that lives in Bolivia, Colombia, Peru, Brazil and the Guyanas (north-eastern South America).

References

nasuta
Turtles of South America
Reptiles of Bolivia
Reptiles of Brazil
Reptiles of Colombia
Reptiles of French Guiana
Reptiles of Guyana
Reptiles of Peru
Reptiles of Suriname
Reptiles described in 1812